The 1990 Rothmans Grand Prix was a professional ranking snooker tournament held at the Hexagon Theatre in Reading, England.

Stephen Hendry won in the final 10–5 against Nigel Bond.

Main draw

Final

Century breaks

 140  Jimmy White
 139, 100  Nigel Bond
 134, 106  Stephen Hendry
 133  John Parrott
 122, 101  Dene O'Kane
 122  Kirk Stevens
 122  Willie Thorne
 119  Andrew Cairns
 117  Martin Clark
 114  Gary Wilkinson
 111  Brady Gollan
 110  Alain Robidoux
 107  Murdo MacLeod
 104  Peter Francisco
 102  Stephen Murphy
 101  Paul Watchorn

References

1990
Grand Prix
Grand Prix (snooker)
Grand Prix (snooker)